Raintown is an unincorporated community in Hendricks County, Indiana, in the United States.

History
A post office was established at Raintown in 1872, and remained in operation until it was discontinued in 1914. The community was named after Hiram Rain, the owner of a mill.

References

Unincorporated communities in Hendricks County, Indiana
Unincorporated communities in Indiana